Corallus priscus is an extinct species of tree boa which lived during the Early Eocene of Brazil, South America. Fossils of the snake were found in the Itaboraí Formation.

References 

priscus
Eocene reptiles of South America
Itaboraian
Paleogene Brazil
Fossils of Brazil
Fossil taxa described in 2001